The Mallardo clan is a Camorra clan operating from the town of Giugliano in Campania, north of the city of Naples. The Mallardo clan is also one of the clans that belongs to the Secondigliano Alliance, that is considered by the authorities as the most powerful Camorra group that is still active.

History
The clan was headed by Domenico Mallardo who was killed by the Maisto clan on June 24, 1976. His son Francesco Mallardo and his younger brother Giuseppe Mallardo succeeded their father. The murder led to a vendetta against the Maisto clan, which was concluded 11 years later in April 1987 with the killing of Antonio Maisto and two others. The triple killing wiped out the Maisto clan from the crime scene in Giugliano, now dominated by the Mallardos. The attack also marked the final break of relations between the Mallardos and the Nuvoletta clan from Marano. To complete the triple murder, the Mallardo clan allied themselves with the Casalesi clan of Francesco Schiavone and Francesco Bidognetti who demanded an end to the historic alliance between Giugliano and Marano. They had been allied in the Nuova Famiglia that aimed to put an end to the power of Raffaele Cutolo's Nuova Camorra Organizzata (NCO) in the late 1970s and 1980s.

The rise of this clan in both power and prominence is inextricably linked to the Licciardi and Contini clans. The three clans together formed a coalition called the Secondigliano Alliance, in order to gain a stranglehold in the drug trafficking and extortion rackets in Naples and dominated the Neapolitan underworld during the 1990s. Mallardo was soon added to the list of thirty most dangerous fugitives in Italy and eventually arrested on August, 2003.

On May 10, 2011, the Italian police seized assets worth 600 million euros allegedly belonging to the Mallardos. The assets included around 900 properties, 23 companies and 200 bank accounts. Several people suspected of being members of the clan were arrested, such as Feliciano Mallardo, the suspected boss. "The clan's companies had seized control of entire economic sectors: from the production and distribution of coffee to betting shops to the wholesale trade in drinks and pharmaceutical products," according to the police.

Current status 
On November 21, 2019, Feliciano Mallardo, brother of Giuseppe and Francesco, was found dead inside his car. According to the investigations, he had suffered a heart attack. Feliciano, who had taken the reins of the organization after his brothers ended up in jail, was known as ‘o Sfregiato.

On April 29, 2020, the Italian police seized €50 million belonging to the clan. The measure concerns a total of 112 properties, 15 companies, numerous bank accounts, 4 luxury cars and 2 horse stables. The seized properties included hotels, restaurants and bathing establishments.

See also

 Camorra
 List of members of the Camorra
 Licciardi clan
 List of Camorra clans
 Casalesi clan
 Contini clan
 Secondigliano Alliance

References

Fiandaca, Giovanni (ed.) (2007), Women and the Mafia: Female Roles in Organized Crime Structures, New York: Springer 

1970s establishments in Italy
Camorra clans
Secondigliano Alliance